A team time trial (TTT) is a road bicycle race in which teams of cyclists race against the clock (see individual time trial for a more detailed description of ITT events).

The winning team in a TTT is determined by the comparing the times of (usually) the fourth-finishing rider in each team (though the relevant finish position can be otherwise specified in advance by the race organisers). This means that each team will try to get their first four (at least) riders across the finish line in a tight group: it is actually a disadvantage for any rider to finish far in advance of the fourth rider, as by staying back a faster rider can help the fourth rider to get a quicker time.

Where a TTT is part of a stage race, it is necessary for each rider to be given a finish time that can be cumulated into the general classification timings. Hence, all riders in the team who finish in the leading bunch are given the time of the fourth rider, and any rider who has been dropped is timed individually in the usual way.

Teams start at equal intervals, usually two, three or four minutes apart. Starting sequences will usually be based on individuals' times in previous events, but in TTTs conducted as part of a multi-stage road race (such as the Tour de France and the Giro d'Italia) the highest ranked teams will normally start later. Later starters have the advantage of knowing what times they need to beat (and this also makes the event more interesting to spectators).

Unlike individual time trials where competitors are not permitted to 'draft' (ride in the slipstream) behind each other, in team time trials, riders in each team employ this as their main tactic, each member taking a turn at the front while teammates 'sit in' behind. After their turn, the lead rider will swing over, allowing the next rider to take the lead, while the leader goes to the back of the team.

Should one team overtake another, the overtaken team would be expected to drop back.

Tactics and formation

The main principle behind a TTT is that a few riders can ride at the front of the formation slightly above their aerobic threshold while others draft behind these riders.  The riders then rotate, allowing some riders to recover while drafting behind fresher teammates.  A rider who is riding at the front is said to be taking a pull.

Accelerations require harder efforts, and therefore it is desirable to have a smooth, steady pace.  Different riders have different power outputs, lactate thresholds and aerodynamics.  In order to equalize the efforts in order to not burn some riders off too early, the weaker riders take shorter pulls and stronger riders take longer pulls, all at the same speed to minimize the change in pace.  A rider finishing a pull usually rotates to the very back of the formation, and the rider who was formerly behind this rider takes over.  A rider who needs more time to recover may take a longer time at the back of the formation while the other teammates rotate in front of this rider.  With increased desired speed, the riders take harder but shorter pulls at the front so as not to burn themselves up.

The choice of formation is crucial to the performance of the team because it dictates how fast the riders can rotate.  The two most popular formations are the single paceline and double paceline.  In a single paceline, riders take longer pulls.  Often, a double paceline is desirable since each rider takes shorter pulls, and therefore a higher pace is able to be maintained.  This is why double pacelines are more often seen at the end of a TTT event when the teams are nearing the finish line.

The recorded finishing time in a team time trial is often based on the N-th rider of that team.  For example, in stage races such as the Tour de France or Giro d'Italia the finishing time is based on the 5th rider of the team, out of a total of 9 riders per team.   Therefore, a team may choose to have a few of its riders take a death pull towards the end of the TTT event, in which the riders take as hard a pull at the front as possible in order to resist the pace at the cost of exhausting themselves with no hope of being able to latch onto the back of the formation for drafting. They then drop back and leave the remainder of the team to finish the time trial.

Professional team time trialling

At the professional level, cycling teams are frequently accompanied by motorcycle outriders, team cars and official scrutineers. In a large stage race, the TTT will involve all remaining members of the team, with the time taken when, say, the fifth rider has crossed the line. This encourages a team to keep the minimum number together; the more riders a team has, the more the task of setting the pace can be shared; some teams may sacrifice weaker riders to maintain a higher pace, or strong riders may put in greater efforts over the early part of a course to give their team a good start before dropping off the pace and finishing alone.

Team time trials in stage racing
In a stage race, teams usually consist of several members.  Each member of the team is credited with the time of the N-th team member to cross the finish line; this is usually after the median member of a nine-person team (e.g. the fourth out of eight members of a team in the Tour de France as of 2018).  However, if a rider is dropped from the team's main group on the course, finishing separately in (N+1)-th position or later, then the dropped rider will get his actual time, not that of the fifth rider. This means there are often difficult decisions to make regarding hanging back for a team leader, and chaos can often ensue if ground rules have not been made by the team's manager.

The '(N+1)-th rider' convention also prevents a team leader who is far stronger than his teammates from riding by himself and setting a pace that would give his weaker teammates an unfair boost in the general classification. Traditionally, each team received the exact time it recorded in that stage.

For two years, starting with the 2004 Tour de France, the only team that received its actual time in the Tour de France was the winning team; the trailing teams at worst received set time penalties based on their placings in that stage – for example, riders in a team that finished six minutes behind the winner might lose only three minutes in the general classification.  According to this rule any team that finished within 30 seconds of the winning team would earn its actual time. This happened in 2005, as Team CSC finished two seconds behind Lance Armstrong's Discovery Channel team in that year's team time trial. With the team time trial returning for the 2009 Tour de France, this rule change was not retained. The team time trial in 2009 is almost 30 kilometres shorter than the one in the 2005 edition.

If a stage race starts with a team time trial, the leader's jersey is given to the rider who finishes first of the winning team.

Fastest Grand Tours team time trials 
The fastest team time trial in the Tour de France was by Orica–GreenEDGE in 2013 during the 25 km team time trial around Nice. Orica–GreenEDGE had an average speed of 57.84 km/h (35.94 mph) and won the stage, with Simon Gerrans taking the yellow jersey. However, the team time trial was not held in the Tour from 2006 through to 2008. The 2009 Tour de France included a 39 km team time trial.
Orica–GreenEDGE        57.841 km/h Nice – Nice           (25 km)   2013
Discovery Channel Team 57.324 km/h Tours – Blois         (67.5 km) 2005 
Team CSC               57.298 km/h Tours – Blois         (67.5 km) 2005 
Team Jumbo–Visma     57.202 km/h Bruxelles – Bruxelles (27.6 km) 2019
Team Jumbo–Visma     56.676 km/h Utrecht – Utrecht     (23.3 km) La Vuelta ciclista a España 2022
Gewiss–Ballan        54.930 km/h Mayenne – Alençon     (67 km)   1995 
Carrera                54.610 km/h Berlin                (40.5 km) 1987

UK team time trial competition
From 1970 to 1999, UK amateur cycling club teams, each comprising four riders, competed in an annual national championship run over courses of 100 kilometres (the championship record time of 2:00:07 was achieved in 1993 by a team from North Wirral Velo which included Chris Boardman). The championship was reconstituted in 2004, with teams of three riders competing over 50 km courses (the 2005 event was won by the Recycling.co.uk team in a time of 1:01:20).

Team time trials are also popular during the early parts of the traditional March to September season, though riders are more likely to compete in teams of two or three; distances will tend to be 10 or 25 miles.

Unique to the UK, the Grand Prix des Gentlemen is a very special event, and rather unique for a two-up time trial. First held in 1970 and based on the Parisian cycle race 'Gentlemen à Aulnay'.  The teams of two must include a veteran rider (over the age of 40), who is classed as the ‘Gentleman’, the other rider being the pacer. The Gentleman isn't allowed to pass the pacer until 200 yards from the finish line. This is a challenging event and often has the older rider making every effort to hold the pace line to save energy and ensure he can contribute for the final pull. In the past riders such as Chris Boardman, Bradley Wiggins and Michael Hutchinson have raced the event as the pacer, while Tour de France rider Sean Yates has been the pacer as well as the 'Gentleman'.

See also
 Eindhoven Team Time Trial
 UCI Road World Championships – Men's team time trial
 UCI Road World Championships – Women's team time trial
 Individual time trial
 Time trialist
 Team pursuit

References

External links

Road bicycle racing terminology
Events in road cycling